Lysholm is a surname.  Notable people with the surname include:

 Alf Lysholm (1893–1973), Swedish engineer
 Catharina Lysholm (1744–1815), Norwegian businesswoman and ship-owner
 Jørgen B Lysholm (1796–1843), Norwegian liquor merchant

Surnames of Scandinavian origin